Earnest Frank was an American football coach. He served as the head football coach at Doane College in Crete, Nebraska in 1913, York College in York, Nebraska from 1917 to 1919 and again in 1921, and Grand Island College in Grand Island, Nebraska from 1922 to 1925. His record at Doane was 5–1–2.

Head coaching record

References

Year of birth missing
Year of death missing
Doane Tigers football coaches
York Panthers football coaches
Doane University alumni